Hylochares is a genus of beetles belonging to the family Eucnemidae.

Species:
 Hylochares cruentatus (Gyllenhal, 1808) – funnet i Finland
 Hylochares harmandi Fleutiaux, 1900
 Hylochares nigricornis (Say, 1823)
 Hylochares populi Brüstle & Muona, 2009

References

Elateroidea
Elateroidea genera